Jakub Bureš (born 26 May 1981) is a Czech football defender. He made over 100 appearances in the Gambrinus liga. He also played international football at under-21 level for Czech Republic U21, scoring twice in the 2004 UEFA European Under-21 Football Championship qualification Group 3.

References

External links
 

1981 births
Living people
Czech footballers
Czech Republic youth international footballers
Czech Republic under-21 international footballers
Czech First League players
FK Chmel Blšany players
1. FC Slovácko players
SFC Opava players
SK Dynamo České Budějovice players

Association football defenders